Giuseppe Verdi is a 1938 Italian biographical film directed by Carmine Gallone and starring Fosco Giachetti, Gaby Morlay and Germana Paolieri. The film portrays the life of the composer Giuseppe Verdi (1813-1901). The casting of Giachetti as Verdi was intended to emphasise the composer's patriotism, as he had recently played patriotic roles in films such as The White Squadron. The film was made at the Cinecittà Studios in Rome. The film is also known by the alternative title The Life of Giuseppe Verdi.

Main cast
 Fosco Giachetti as Giuseppe Verdi 
 Gaby Morlay as Giuseppina Strepponi 
 Germana Paolieri as Margherita Barezzi 
 Camillo Pilotto as Antonio Barezzi 
 Cesco Baseggio as il padre di Verdi 
 Maria Jacobini as Luigia Uttini, madre di Verdi 
 Maria Cebotari as Teresa Stolz 
 Febo Mari as Merelli, il direttore della Scala di Milano 
 Carlo Duse as Temistocle Solera 
 Eugenio Duse as L'impresario Massini 
 Enrico Glori as Il maestro Mariani 
 Clara Padoa as La contessa Maffei 
 Achille Majeroni as Il maestro Basili 
 Carlo Tamberlani as Demalde 
 Augusto Di Giovanni as Antonio Ghislanzoni 
 Gustavo Serena as Salvadore Cammarano 
 Guido Celano as Francesco Maria Piave 
 Henri Rollan as Victor Hugo 
 Lamberto Picasso as Gaetano Donizetti 
 Gabriel Gabrio as Honoré de Balzac 
 Pierre Brasseur as Alexandre Dumas fils

References

Bibliography
 Landy, Marcia. The Folklore of Consensus: Theatricality in the Italian Cinema, 1930-1943. SUNY Press, 1998.

External links

1938 films
1930s historical musical films
1930s biographical films
Italian historical musical films
Italian biographical films
1930s Italian-language films
Films directed by Carmine Gallone
Films set in the 19th century
Films about composers
Films about classical music and musicians
Cultural depictions of Giuseppe Verdi
Cultural depictions of Honoré de Balzac
Alexandre Dumas
Films shot at Cinecittà Studios
Italian black-and-white films
Cultural depictions of Victor Hugo
1930s Italian films